Mark John Byrnes (born 8 February 1982) is an Australian footballer who plays for APIA Leichhardt Tigers in the New South Wales Premier League.

Club career
After a short stint with SV Salzburg in Austria, he won two NSL championship medals in a row with Perth Glory.

Due to the demise of the National Soccer League after the 2003/2004 season, in July of that year he signed with Finnish club, FC Hämeenlinna. He returned to Australia to form part of Melbourne Victory's A-League 2005–06 squad, but found his chances limited by the emergence of younger defenders Adrian Leijer and Daniel Piorkowski. He was part of Melbourne's A-League championship winning side in 2006–2007. However at the end of the season, on 1 March 2007, he was released by the club.

In 2007, he was announced as a short term signing for Victorian Premier League side Richmond Eagles for three matches.
In 2008, Byrnes went on trial with English lower league football clubs Port Vale and Luton Town. He impressed during an overseas pre-season tour to the extent that he would have been offered a contract had he not suffered a minor injury during the last tour match.

On 23 September 2009 he was signed by Gold Coast United as a four-week injury replacement for Daniel Piorkowski.

International career
He was captain of the Australian Under-17 team which reached the final of the 1999 FIFA U-17 World Championship.

Honours
With Australia:
 FIFA U-17 World Championship: 1999 (Runners-up)
With Perth Glory:
  NSL Championship: 2002–03, 2003–04

References

External links
 OzFootball profile

1982 births
Living people
Sportsmen from New South Wales
Australian people of Irish descent
Association football defenders
Australian expatriate soccer players
Expatriate footballers in Austria
Expatriate footballers in Italy
Expatriate footballers in Finland
A-League Men players
National Soccer League (Australia) players
Austrian Football Bundesliga players
Veikkausliiga players
FC Hämeenlinna players
FC Red Bull Salzburg players
Melbourne Victory FC players
Parramatta Power players
Perth Glory FC players
Sydney Olympic FC players
New South Wales Institute of Sport alumni
Gold Coast United FC players
Soccer players from Sydney
Australian soccer players